Rosevear's lemniscomys or Rosevear's striped grass mouse (Lemniscomys roseveari) is a species of rodent in the family Muridae.
It is found in Zambia and possibly Angola, where its natural habitat is cryptosephalum dry forest.
The species is threatened by habitat loss.

References

Rodents of Africa
Fauna of Central Africa
Fauna of Southern Africa
Lemniscomys
Taxonomy articles created by Polbot
Mammals described in 1980